Mohabbat Ki Kasam is a 1986 Bollywood action melodrama film directed by K. Pappu. It stars Amjad Khan, Kulbhushan Kharbanda and Tanuja,  with special appearances from two of Bollywood's biggest stars, Dharmendra and Rajesh Khanna. Produced by P. B. Pictures, it features music by Kamalkant. The lyricist was  Kulwant Jani. The director of photography was Sushil Chopra, the film also features Vinod Mehra, Shoma Anand, Moon Moon Sen, Anita Raj, Paintal and Imtiaz Khan, forming an ensemble cast.

Plot
Two brothers, Thakur Vikram Singh (Kulbhushan Kharbanda), and Baseera Singh (Amjad Khan) live in the same village. Baseera is resentful that Vikram has got all he ever wanted, the estate, the wealth, the title, and lovely wife (Kaushalya Tanuja). Baseera, unable to control his anger, kills one of Vikram's men, and is sentenced to be hanged until death. Baseera leaves the legacy of revenge and hatred with his son, Jageera. Vikram undertakes to look after his nephew as his own, and he already has a son. Additionally, Vikram also adopts a boy as his son.

Jageera, now grown up,  backlashes against the family; Vikram's son is killed, and the adopted son is accused of having sexual relationship with Vikram's daughter-in-law. And the person to pronounce the sentence is non other than fair-minded and generous Thakur Vikram Singh.

Cast
Amjad Khan as Basheera Singh
Kulbhushan Kharbanda as Thakur Vikram Singh
Tanuja as Kaushalya Singh
Rajesh Khanna as Krishna
Moon Moon Sen as Radha
Dharmendra as Shop-owner
Anita Raj as Shop-owner's Wife
Vinod Mehra as Dancer / Singer 
Shoma Anand as Dancer / Singer
Master Bhagwan as a Dancer
Paintal as Professor Lallu
Rajesh Puri as a Dancer

Soundtrack
The lyrics were written by Kulwant Jani who was active from 1970s-90s and had written lyrics for films like Ramanand Sagar's Lalkaar (1972), Anand Sagar's Hamrahi (1972), O. P. Ralhan's Paapi (1977), and Tarachand Barjatya's Ek Baar Kaho (1980). Music director was Kamalkant, with playback singing provided by Mohammed Aziz, Mahendra Kapoor, Shabbir Kumar, Alka Yagnik and Shailendra Singh.

Songlist

References

External links
 

1986 films
1980s Hindi-language films
Films directed by K. Pappu